John Borger may refer to:
John Borger, known as Borgeous, American DJ and music producer
John Borger (Canadian football) (born c. 1935), Canadian football player

See also
John Berger (disambiguation)